Vesce may refer to:

Vesce (Tábor District), village in the Czech Republic
Ryan Vesce (born 1982), American ice hockey player